Festival of Death may refer to:

 Festival of Death (novel), a novel written by Jonathan Morris based on the British science fiction television series Doctor Who
 Festival of Death (album), an album by Brodequin